Explosivo 008 is a 1940 Argentine crime film directed by German exiled filmmaker James Bauer.

Cast
 María Antinea
 Lea Conti
 Pablo Cumo
 María de la Fuente
 Fausto Etchegoin
 Vicente Padula
 Joaquín Petrocino
 Juan Sarcione
 Nicolás Taricano
 Felipe Panigazzi
 Ilze Gonda

External links
 

1940 films
1940s Spanish-language films
Argentine black-and-white films
Argentine crime films
1940 crime films
1940s Argentine films